The 1935 Orange Bowl was an American college football bowl game between the Bucknell Bison and Miami Hurricanes. Bucknell won the game, 26–0. It was the first edition of the Orange Bowl and took place at Miami Field in Miami on January 1, 1935, with about 5,000 in attendance. Miami Field was located on the same site as the Orange Bowl stadium, which was built in 1937.

The Bison defense held Miami to just four first downs and 28 yards total offense en route to the victory. The Bucknell offense gained 278 yards and earned its sixth shutout of the season.

References

Orange Bowl
Orange Bowl
Bucknell Bison football bowl games
Miami Hurricanes football bowl games
Orange Bowl
January 1935 sports events